Maria Volodymyrivna "Marichka" Padalko (born 26 February 1976) is a Ukrainian television journalist, well known for her feminist opinions. She is married to Ukrainian politician Yehor Soboliev with whom she has three children.

References

1976 births
Living people
Television presenters from Kyiv
Ukrainian television journalists
1+1 (TV channel) people